Columnarios are silver coins that were minted by Spain from 1732 to 1773 throughout its New World colonies. While the majority of columnarios were struck in Mexico, smaller mints existed in Guatemala; Lima, Peru; Santiago, Chile; Potosí, Bolivia; and Colombia. The base denomination is an 8 reales coin (aka Piece of eight or Spanish dollar). Other minor denominations included 4 reales, 2 reales, 1 real, and 1/2 real. The 8 reales coin is the predecessor to the American dollar. Before the United States Mint was in production, columnarios circulated, along with other coinage, in the US colonies, as legal tender until the middle of the 19th century.

Prior to the columnario, Spanish coins were hammer struck. These rather crude looking coins were called cobs. Clipping was a problem with cobs as it was easy to shave small amounts of silver from their edges, and although this action was punishable by death, it was still a widespread occurrence. The columnario, unlike the odd-shaped cob, is a round coin with milled edges which makes clipping detectable and less likely to occur.

The design of the columnario consists on the reverse of two worlds — representing the new world and old world — with a royal crown above. Below are the waves of the sea that separate the worlds and on the left and right are columns (hence the name "columnarios") representing the Pillars of Hercules adorned with crowns and wrapped with a banner spelling "PLUS ULTRA", meaning "more beyond". The reverse also has the letters "VTRAQUE VNUM", referring to the Old and New Worlds, "Both are One", and the date at the bottom, with mint marks on both sides.

The obverse features the crown's name followed by "D G HISPAN ET IND REX", meaning, "By the Grace of God, King of Spain and the Indies." The assayer's mark is on the left and the denomination on the right of a large Spanish shield which is adorned with a royal crown atop. Various florets, rosettes, stops, and other features are used to separate features.

The edge has a repeating laurel leaf design which is very difficult to counterfeit and is often used for authentication purposes.

Currently, the Mexican 8 reales columnario is worth US$200 or more, depending on condition. Specimens from other mints fetch much higher values due to their rarity.

External links

 Columnarios.com, a website devoted to the columnario
 The Colonial Coinage of Spanish America: an introduction by Daniel Frank Sedwick

Medieval currencies
Silver coins
Spanish colonization of the Americas
Coins of Bolivia
Coins of Spain